Mirosławice may refer to the following places in Poland:
Mirosławice, Lower Silesian Voivodeship (south-west Poland)
Mirosławice, Kuyavian-Pomeranian Voivodeship (north-central Poland)
Mirosławice, Łódź Voivodeship (central Poland)
Mirosławice, West Pomeranian Voivodeship (north-west Poland)